Henry North Holroyd, 3rd Earl of Sheffield (18 January 1832 – 21 April 1909), styled Viscount Pevensey until 1876, was an English Conservative politician and patron of cricket. The Sheffield Shield is named after him.

Life
Born in Marylebone, London, Sheffield was the second but eldest surviving son of George Holroyd, 2nd Earl of Sheffield, and his wife the former Lady Harriet Lascelles, daughter of Henry Lascelles, 2nd Earl of Harewood. He was educated at Eton College, and served as a diplomat in Constantinople and Copenhagen. He sat as Conservative Member of Parliament for Sussex East from 1857 to 1865. In 1876 he succeeded his father in the earldom.

Sheffield played cricket in his younger days, including one first-class match, but is best remembered as a patron of the sport. He established a private ground at Sheffield Park near Uckfield, Sussex, and held numerous matches there, many of them against touring teams from overseas, and some of them of first-class standing. Concerned with the declining standard of cricket in Australia, he organised, financed and managed the English tour of Australia in 1891–92 under the captaincy of W. G. Grace. While in Australia he donated £150 to the New South Wales Cricket Association which was used to purchase a plate and establish the competition known as the Sheffield Shield, the domestic first-class cricket competition of Australia. He was a major benefactor of the Sussex County Cricket Club and served as its President from 1879 until 1897.

Lord Sheffield died in Beaulieu-sur-Mer, France, in April 1909, aged 77. Rumoured to be homosexual, he remained unmarried, and on his death the earldom became extinct. However, he was succeeded in his junior title of Baron Sheffield, which had a special remainder that allowed it to be passed through female lines, by his first cousin once removed, Edward Stanley, 4th Baron Stanley of Alderley.

References

References
Kidd, Charles, Williamson, David (editors). Debrett's Peerage and Baronetage (1990 edition). New York: St Martin's Press, 1990 

MSN Encarta entry (Archived here; accessed 29 March 2016.)

External links 
 

|-

1832 births
1909 deaths
People educated at Eton College
Diplomats from London
Pevensey, Henry Holroyd, Viscount
Earls in the Peerage of Ireland
Holroyd, Henry
English cricket administrators
Pevensey, Henry Holroyd, Viscount
Pevensey, Henry Holroyd, Viscount
UK MPs who inherited peerages
Holroyd, Henry
Barons Sheffield
19th-century British businesspeople